The Atabegs of Yazd (Atābakān-e Yazd) were a local dynasty, which ruled the city of Yazd from about 1141 to 1319. They succeeded the Kakuyids to whom they were linked by marriage.

The names of the first members of the dynasty indicate that they were seemingly ethnically Persian, but like the Hazaraspids they had accepted the Turkish title of Atabeg. Most of the Atabegs of Yazd were tributaries to the Seljuks and the Mongol Il-Khans until they were finally overthrown by the Muzaffarids.

List of rulers
 Sam ibn Wardanruz (1141–1188)
 Langar ibn Wardanruz (1188–1207)
 Wardanruz ibn Langar (1207–1219)
 Isfahsalar ibn Langar (1219–1229)
 Mahmud Shah ibn Isfahsalar (1229–1241)
 Salghur Shah ibn Mahmud Shah (1241–1252)
 Toghan Shah ibn Salghur Shah (1252–1272)
 Ala al-Dawla ibn Toghan Shah (1272–1275) 
 Yusuf Shah ibn Toghan Shah (1275–1297)
 Mongol occupation (1297–1315)
 Hajji Shah ibn Yusuf Shah (1315–1319)

References

Sources

Iranian Muslim dynasties
Yazd Province
Atabegs
12th century in Iran
13th century in Iran